Augusto Stanley (born 3 August 1987 in Benjamín Aráoz, Tucumán, Argentina) is a Paraguayan sprinter. At the 2012 Summer Olympics, he competed in the Men's 400 metres.

References

1987 births
Living people
People from Tucumán Province
Argentine emigrants to Paraguay
Argentine people of British descent
Paraguayan people of British descent
Paraguayan male sprinters
Olympic athletes of Paraguay
Athletes (track and field) at the 2012 Summer Olympics
Pan American Games competitors for Paraguay
Athletes (track and field) at the 2011 Pan American Games
World Athletics Championships athletes for Paraguay